McAlister is an unincorporated community in Quay County, New Mexico, United States. It is located on New Mexico State Road 252, east of House.

Unincorporated communities in Quay County, New Mexico
Unincorporated communities in New Mexico